Gokomere is a place in Zimbabwe,  from Masvingo, known for its rock art and pottery traditions dating from 300 to 650 AD.

The ancient Bantu people who inhabited the area of Great Zimbabwe around the 4th century AD probably built the complex between 1000 and 1200 AD. The Gokomere traded via ancient trading routes over the Chimanimani Mountains on the current Zimbabwe-Mozambique border with the Swahili civilization on the Kenyan and Tanzanian coast. This group is believe to have given rise to the Shona and Rozwi peoples. They may also comprise the majority of the African ancestry of the Lemba people, who paternally descend from ancient Semites whom came to Africa via Sena in Yemen.

The modern descendants of the Rozwi are called the Barotse. They speak the Karanga language and second languages including English in Zimbabwe and Sena, Ndau dialect of Shona, and Portuguese in Mozambique.

Gokomere also refers to a school located close to the town of Masvingo.

References 

Ethnic groups in Zimbabwe
Ethnic groups in Mozambique
History of Zimbabwe
Archaeological sites of Eastern Africa
Archaeology of Eastern Africa